Maddox is an unincorporated community in Hardin County, Tennessee. Maddox is located at the intersection of Tennessee State Route 69 and Tennessee State Route 226, south of Savannah.

References

Unincorporated communities in Hardin County, Tennessee
Unincorporated communities in Tennessee